The name Faxai has been used to name four tropical cyclones in the northwestern Pacific Ocean. The name was contributed by Laos and is a woman's given name in the Lao language.
 Typhoon Faxai (2001) (T0125, 33W)
 Severe Tropical Storm Faxai (2007) (T0720, 20W, Juaning) – approached Japan.
 Typhoon Faxai (2014) (T1403, 03W) – had no effects on land.
 Typhoon Faxai (2019) (T1915, 14W) – Category 4 typhoon that made landfall in the Kantō region of Japan.

The name Faxai was retired by the ESCAP/WMO Typhoon Committee in February 2019 season and replaced with the name Nongfa, which is a lake in extreme southern Laos.

Pacific typhoon set index articles